Nothofagus discoidea is a species of plant in the family Nothofagaceae. It is endemic to New Caledonia.

References

Nothofagaceae
Endemic flora of New Caledonia
Vulnerable plants
Taxonomy articles created by Polbot